Jacob Vosmaer (1574, Delft – 1641, Delft) was a Dutch Golden Age painter.

Biography
According to Houbraken he was born in Delft as a descendant of an old line of Vosmeers. According to the RKD he was the son of the Delft gold- and silversmith Wouter Vosmaer, and the brother of the silversmith Arent Woutersz Vosmaer. 

He started his career as a landscape specialist, but switched to flowers, which brought him more success. He visited Italy as a young man and returned to Delft in 1608 at the age of 24, where he remained and became a respected citizen, and major in the schutterij. 

He became a member of the Delft Guild of St. Luke before 1613, where he was a pupil of Jacob de Gheyn II. He later taught his nephews Daniel Vosmaer and Abraham Vosmeer, and the Dane Jakob Mogensen or Ebbe Ulfeldt. He was the uncle of Christiaen van Couwenbergh. No known landscapes by his hand survive.

He died in Delft in 1641.

References

Jacob Vosmaer on Artnet

External links
Vermeer and The Delft School, a full text exhibition catalog from The Metropolitan Museum of Art, which contains material on Jacob Vosmaer

1574 births
1641 deaths
Dutch Golden Age painters
Dutch male painters
Artists from Delft
Painters from Delft